Kerch is a city in Crimea in Eastern Europe.

Kerch, Kerech, Kerich or Korch may refer to:

Places
 Kerch Strait, a strait between Black Sea and Azov Sea
 Kerch Peninsula, a peninsula on Crimean side of the Kerch Strait
 Kerch, Isfahan, a village in Isfahan Province, Iran
 Kerch, South Khorasan, a village in South Khorasan Province, Iran

Fictional places
 Kerch, a fictional nation in Leigh Bardugo's Grishaverse

People with the surname
Alfred Kiprato Kerich, Kenyan politician
Morten Korch (1876–1954), Danish writer

Other uses
 Russian destroyer Kerch, Fidonisy-class destroyer of the Imperial Russian Navy
 Soviet cruiser Kerch, the former Italian cruiser Emanuele Filiberto Duca d'Aosta in Soviet Navy service
 Russian cruiser Kerch, a Project 1134B Berkut B (Kara-class) missile cruiser of the Soviet and later Russian Navy.